James McClelland may refer to:

 James McClelland (psychologist) (born 1948), American psychologist and cognitive neuroscientist
 James McClelland (solicitor-general) (c. 1768–1831), Irish politician and Solicitor-General
 James D. McClelland (1848–1919), New York politician
 Jimmy McClelland (1903–1976), Scottish footballer
 Jim McClelland (1915–1999), Australian solicitor, jurist and politician